The Point of Pittsburgh: Production and Struggle at the Forks of the Ohio is an American history book by Charles McCollester, a labor historian and activist, who argues that Pittsburgh, Pennsylvania was the key to the industrial development that made the United States a world power. He also links the struggle of the region’s people for democratic rights and a decent standard of living to the creation of the American middle class.

While many books document the role played by the Pittsburgh industrialists Andrew Carnegie, Andrew Mellon, and Henry Clay Frick, McCollester tells a rarely told people's history of the Indians and the workers in Western Pennsylvania. McCollester describes those who first stood at the Forks of the Ohio, those who dug the coal, tended the furnaces, wrested the iron, steel, glass and aluminum from raw material, who built the boats, the bridges, the rail equipment and the generators, the skyscrapers, the highways, built the homes, and raised the families.

The book was published in November 2008, the 250th anniversary of Pittsburgh's founding.

See also
History of Pittsburgh

Sources
Books in Print. Bowker, 2008.
 Book Website for The Point of Pittsburgh
 "The Point of Pittsburgh Social Network Page"
 Post-Gazette story on the book
 City Paper review of the book

2008 non-fiction books
History of Pittsburgh
Books about politics of the United States
Books about economic history
History books about the United States